Du Pengyu (born 22 January 1988) is a Chinese former badminton player. Du specializes in men's singles where he has distinguished himself as one of China's top ranked male players. His earliest major success came at the 2010 Swiss Open Super Series where he reached the semifinals.

Achievements

BWF World Championships 
Men's singles

Asian Championships 
Men's singles

East Asian Games 
Men's singles

BWF Superseries 
The BWF Superseries, launched on 14 December 2006 and implemented in 2007, is a series of elite badminton tournaments, sanctioned by Badminton World Federation (BWF). BWF Superseries has two level such as Superseries and Superseries Premier. A season of Superseries features twelve tournaments around the world, which introduced since 2011, with successful players invited to the Superseries Finals held at the year end.

Men's singles

  BWF Superseries Finals tournament
  BWF Superseries Premier tournament
  BWF Superseries tournament

BWF Grand Prix 
The BWF Grand Prix has two level such as Grand Prix and Grand Prix Gold. It is a series of badminton tournaments, sanctioned by Badminton World Federation (BWF) since 2007.

Men's singles

  BWF Grand Prix Gold tournament
  BWF Grand Prix tournament

Performance timeline

Singles performance timeline

Record against selected opponents 
Record against year-end Finals finalists, World Championships semi finalists, and Olympic quarter finalists.

References

External links 
 

1988 births
Living people
Sportspeople from Baoding
Badminton players from Hebei
Chinese male badminton players
21st-century Chinese people